The Custodian is a 1993 Australian drama film, written and directed by John Dingwall, starring Anthony LaPaglia, Hugo Weaving and Barry Otto. LaPaglia plays Det. Sgt. James Quinlan, a police officer who attempts to bring his corrupt partner Det. Church, played by Weaving, to justice.

John Dingwall claims he wrote around 16 drafts of the script.

It received three Australian Film Institute nominations.

References

External links
 
 
The Custodian at Oz Movies
 

1993 drama films
1993 films
Australian drama films
Films shot in Sydney
1990s English-language films
1990s Australian films